The Alexander & Anna Schwartz Farm, located at 57 E. Rd. 70 in Dighton, Kansas, was listed on the National Register of Historic Places in 2014.

It includes three buildings (a house built c.1928, a barn, and a smokehouse/cellar) and an Aermotor windmill.  The house is built of  structural hollow clay tile, also known as structural terra cotta.

References

External links

Buildings and structures in Lane County, Kansas
Windpumps in the United States
Farmhouses in the United States
Smokehouses
Terracotta
Barns in Kansas
Farms on the National Register of Historic Places in Kansas
1928 establishments in Kansas
Windmills on the National Register of Historic Places
Wind power in Kansas